Gladys Kessler (January 22, 1938 — March 17, 2023) was a United States district judge of the United States District Court for the District of Columbia.

Education and career
After receiving her Bachelor of Arts degree from Cornell University and Bachelor of Laws from Harvard Law School, she was hired by the National Labor Relations Board. She worked as a legislative assistant to United States Senator Harrison A. Williams (D–NJ), and subsequently for United States Congressman Jonathan B. Bingham (D–NY). Kessler worked for the New York City Board of Education, and then opened a public interest law firm.

Judicial career

Superior Court of the District of Columbia service 
In June 1977, she was appointed Associate Judge of the Superior Court of the District of Columbia, and from 1981 to 1985 served as Presiding Judge of the Family Division.  She was President of the National Association of Women Judges from 1983 to 1984, and currently serves on the Executive Committee of the American Bar Association Conference of Federal Trial Judges and the U.S. Judicial Conference's Committee on Court Administration and Management.

Federal judicial service 
On March 22, 1994, President Bill Clinton nominated Kessler to serve as a United States District Judge for the United States District Court for the District of Columbia, to the seat vacated by Judge Michael Boudin. She was confirmed by the Senate on June 15, 1994, and received her commission on June 16, 1994. She assumed senior status on January 22, 2007, and was succeeded by Judge Amy Berman Jackson. She died on March 17, 2023.

In 2002 she heard a case lodged by the Holy Land Foundation for Relief and Development appealing against their designation as a terrorist organisation under Executive Order 13224. At the time the Palestinian-American charity was the largest Muslim charity in the United States, taking $13 million in donations in 2000. The Judge dismissed the case ordering all evidence be struck from the record. The Circuit Court of Appeal decided that she had been mistaken in her decision to not allow the case to go before a jury, but due to the fact that the case involved national security they would allow the decision to stand.

Detainee treatment cases
Kessler is the first judge to consider an appeal that the executive branch is violating the Detainee Treatment Act. In 2006, she heard the case of Mohammad Bawazir, a prisoner at Camp Delta. The George W. Bush Administration argued that the Detainee Treatment Act, legislation spearheaded by John McCain banning cruel or inhuman treatment, did not apply to Bawazir and other detainees at the Guantanamo Bay detention camp, Cuba.

On October 10, 2007, the Washington Post headlined "Judge Orders U.S. Not to Transfer Tunisian Detainee," and reported that Judge Kessler "ruled last week that Mohammed Abdul Rahman cannot be sent [from Guantanamo] to Tunisia because he could suffer 'irreparable harm." The detainee's lawyer said, "The executive has now been told it cannot bury its Guantanamo mistakes in Third World prisons." He also stated that, "This is the first time the judicial branch has exercised its inherent power to control the excesses of the executive as to treatment of prisoners at Guantanamo Bay."

Kessler twice denied relief to detainee Jihad Ahmed Mustafa Dhiab, first determining that she had no jurisdiction over his confinement conditions, and, after that theory was rejected by the United States Court of Appeals for the District of Columbia Circuit, that the government was permitted to use force-feedings on detainees during the Guantanamo Bay hunger strikes.  Kessler did, however, twice grant news media requests for access to classified video of the force-feedings, before ultimately being reversed by the D.C. Circuit.

See also
 List of Jewish American jurists
 United States v. Philip Morris

References

External links

1938 births
Living people
Cornell University alumni
Harvard Law School alumni
Judges of the United States District Court for the District of Columbia
United States district court judges appointed by Bill Clinton
Judges presiding over Guantanamo habeas petitions
Lawyers from New York City
Judges of the Superior Court of the District of Columbia
20th-century American judges
21st-century American judges
20th-century American women judges
21st-century American women judges